5α-Pregnan-17α-ol-3,20-dione, also known as 17α-hydroxy-dihydroprogesterone (17‐OH-DHP) is an endogenous steroid.

Function
5α-Pregnan-17α-ol-3,20-dione is the first intermediate product within the androgen backdoor pathway in which 17α-hydroxyprogesterone (17‐OHP) is 5α-reduced and finally converted to 5α-dihydrotestosterone (DHT) without testosterone intermediate. The subsequent intermediate products in the pathway are 5α-pregnane-3α,17α-diol-20-one, androsterone and 5α-androstane-3α,17β-diol.

Biosynthesis
5α-Pregnan-17α-ol-3,20-dione is produced by 5α-reduction of 17-OHP. The reaction is catalyzed by SRD5A1/SRD5A2 enzymes.

See also
 Androgen backdoor pathway
 5α-Dihydrotestosterone

References

Pregnanes
5α-Pregnanes